HMS Hadleigh Castle (K355) was a  of Britain's Royal Navy.

Hadleigh Castle was the first ship to be fitted with a production version of the highly effective Squid anti-submarine mortar, the prototype of which had only been installed on board HMS Ambuscade in May 1943.

She was laid down at Smiths Dock in Middlesbrough on 4 April 1943 and launched on 21 June 1943 before being commissioned on 18 September 1943

References

Publications

External links
HMS Hadleigh Castle (K355) - Castle Class Corvette. Naval-History.net

 

Castle-class corvettes
1944 ships
Ships built on the River Tees